Carlisle is an unincorporated community in Trinity County, Texas.  Its population is 68 as of 2000. The community was named after John Carlisle who established mills in the Carlisle and Carmona areas.  A post office was established in 1906 and discontinued in 1955.

References

Unincorporated communities in Trinity County, Texas
Unincorporated communities in Texas